is a Japanese football player. He plays for FC Ryukyu.

Career
Yuki Omoto joined J2 League club FC Gifu in 2017.

Club statistics
Updated to 22 February 2019.

References

External links
Profile at Tokushima Vortis

1994 births
Living people
Hannan University alumni
Association football people from Shiga Prefecture
Japanese footballers
J1 League players
J2 League players
FC Gifu players
Tokushima Vortis players
V-Varen Nagasaki players
Albirex Niigata players
FC Ryukyu players
Association football defenders